The Wiyot Tribe is a federally recognized tribe of Wiyot people. They are the aboriginal people of Humboldt Bay, Mad River and lower Eel River.

Other Wiyot people are enrolled in the Blue Lake Rancheria, Rohnerville Rancheria and Trinidad Rancherias.

Reservation

The Wiyot Tribe's land base includes two Reservations Table Bluff Reservation and the Old Table Bluff Reservation are located 16 miles southwest of Eureka, California. The new Table Bluff Reservation is reservation is 88-acres large. The Old Table Bluff Reservation was established in 1908, when a church donated 20 acres of land to the Wiyot Tribe. The land was allotted to individuals. The Reservation was formally recognized by the government in 1981 and 102 acres was purchased for the tribe. The Reservation is located on Table Bluff in Humboldt County, California. The land is also known as the "Old Reservation" for the Wiyot. As of the 2010 Census the population was 103.

Government
The Wiyot Tribe is headquartered in Loleta, California. The tribe is governed by a democratically elected, seven-member tribal council. The current tribal administration is as follows:

 Tribal Chair: Ted Hernandez
 Vice Chairperson: Brian Mead
 Secretary: Leona Wilkinson
 Treasurer: Linda Lange
 Councilperson: Kirsten Boyce
 Councilperson: Hazel James.

Language
English is commonly spoken by the tribe. The Wiyot language belongs to the California branch of Algic languages. The language is written in the Latin script, and a dictionary and grammar has been published for Wiyot. The last fluent speaker of Wiyot died in 1962.

History
Prior to European contact, Wiyot people numbered approximately 2,000. They first encountered Europeans in 1802. Non-native settlers overran Wiyote lands during the California Gold Rush that started in 1849. Wiyots were killed in the Rogue River Indian War in 1852. 

On 26 February 1860, as the Wiyote people were celebrating their world renewal ceremony, European-American people ambushed Wiyot elders, women, and children in the (Wiyot Massacre, now known as the Indian Island Massacre) on what is now Indian Island (previously Gunther Island). The young men were off collecting supplies for the next day's ceremony leaving the village defenseless, allowing for a group of men from Eureka (who had been planning the massacre) to row across the bay carrying silent weapons (to avoid alarming the nearby city). When the men came back, their families were piled up leaving only one survivor, a hidden infant. Two other villages were massacred that night. Post massacre numbers were estimated to be around 200.

Notes

References
 Pritzker, Barry M. A Native American Encyclopedia: History, Culture, and Peoples. Oxford: Oxford University Press, 2000. .

External links
 Wiyot Tribe, official website

Wiyot tribe
Native American tribes in California
Federally recognized tribes in the United States
1908 establishments in California